The 1999 NCAA Division I-AA football season, part of college football in the United States organized by the National Collegiate Athletic Association (NCAA) at the Division I-AA level, began in August 1999, and concluded with the 1999 NCAA Division I-AA Football Championship Game on December 18, 1999, at Finley Stadium in Chattanooga, Tennessee. The Georgia Southern Eagles won their fifth I-AA championship, defeating the Youngstown State Penguins by a score of 59−24.

Conference changes and new programs

Conference standings

Conference champions

Postseason

NCAA Division I-AA playoff bracket

* By team name denotes host institution

* By score denotes overtime

Source:

References